Eileen Fulton (born Margaret Elizabeth McLarty; September 13, 1933) is an American actress. She is known for her television role as Lisa on the CBS soap opera As the World Turns, a role that she played almost continuously for 50 years (with two notable interruptions) from May 18, 1960 until the show's ending on September 17, 2010.

Career

As the World Turns
The character of Lisa had a storied history, having been married eight times, divorced three times and widowed four times (with her most recent marriage annulled) making her full name Lisa Miller Hughes Eldridge Shea Colman McColl Mitchell Grimaldi Chedwyn.

The character and actress were, in Fulton's first decades on As the World Turns, very popular (to the point where, in the late 1960s, Fulton had to hire a publicist, the first soap actress to do so). The character became hated after a simple sequence where Lisa hires a maid to clean the house and went gallivanting about town. When mother-in-law Nancy complimented Lisa on what a nice home she made for her son Bob, the audience became furious, stopping Fulton on the street and slapping her. 

CBS had to hire a bodyguard to escort her to and from the studio. Despite her popularity, Fulton's run has not been without controversy. During the late 1960s, after her onscreen son was aged from age 12 to 19, Fulton insisted it be written into her contract that her character could not become a grandmother. She feared that the perception of her as a grandmother, instead of a glamorous and vital woman, would cause the writers to kill off her character. (This had been done when Barbara Berjer, who was playing one of Lisa's rivals, Claire Shea, became a grandmother.) Fans, believing that the "granny clause" as it became known, was still in effect (which it was not), sent Fulton so much threatening "hate mail" when Lisa's onscreen daughter-in-law, Margo, had a miscarriage in 1986, that she had to hire a bodyguard.

She left the show three times. The first time was for several months in 1963, when she was replaced in the role of Lisa by actress Pamela King. She left again in 1965 to bring her Lisa character to her own prime time soap spin-off, Our Private World. Our Private World lasted less than a season, and Fulton took several months off before returning to As the World Turns in early 1966
. She left again in 1983 after a contract dispute with executive producer Mary-Ellis Bunim, returning the next year. During Fulton's 1983-1984 absence, the role of Lisa was played by Betsy von Furstenberg.  She was also temporarily replaced for a few days by Carmen Duncan in 2004, when she could not appear in several episodes due to illness.

Fulton was prominently featured in a May 2000 show marking her and costar Don Hastings' fortieth anniversaries on ATWT, as well as in April 2006 during the show's 50th anniversary episode; and from January 2008 to August 2008, was seen in at least two episodes per week. Her appearances dropped off after that time, though she was again featured in a two-part tribute episode in May 2010, celebrating her fiftieth year on the show; she remained on the show through its cancellation, appearing in the final episode in September 2010.

Theatre
While playing Lisa, Fulton performed in the Off-Broadway production of The Fantasticks and the Broadway production of Who's Afraid of Virginia Woolf? as "Honey" in 1963. Fulton would perform her scenes for the live airing of As the World Turns, then be on a Broadway stage for the matinee performance in Who’s Afraid of Virginia Woolf? (in a 2007 Archives of American Television interview, Fulton explained that there was only a 30-minute window, between the time ATWT concluded its live broadcast at 2:00 p.m, and the beginning of the first act of Virginia Woolf, for her to travel from CBS' studios to the Billy Rose Theatre, and get into costume, and that this was only possible because her character didn't appear onstage for the first twenty minutes of the play), and by evening she would be back onstage in the Off-Broadway musical, The Fantasticks.
Her other theatre credits include the Off-Broadway production of Abe Lincoln in Illinois with Hal Holbrook in 1963, Many Loves, Summer of the Seventeenth Doll, and Nite Club Confidential.

She also appeared in regional theatre productions including Plaza Suite, It Had To be You, The Owl and the Pussycat, Goodbye Charlie and Cat on a Hot Tin Roof.

Other work
Fulton has written two memoirs, How My World Turns and As My World Still Turns. She also wrote a mystery novel, called Soap Opera, loosely based on her experiences on As the World Turns as well as six murder mystery novels Take One for Murder about a soap opera star "Nina" and her detective boyfriend "Dino." Fulton is also a singer, and has performed a number of cabaret and nightclub acts, in addition to her acting.

Personal
Fulton is a 1956 graduate of Greensboro College and was granted an honorary doctorate in 2005, on the 50th anniversary of her college graduation. She was the commencement speaker at Greensboro College's graduation ceremony in 2005.

In September 1998, she was inducted into the Soap Opera Hall of Fame. Fulton has also appeared in five independent films which earned her the Achievement in Television and Film Award at the Independent Filmmakers Award ceremony. In 2003, she was presented with the Lifetime Achievement Award by the TV Academy during the 31st Annual Daytime Emmy Awards.

Fulton was married to landscape architect Rick McMorrow for three months in 1989.

References

External links
 
 

1933 births
American soap opera actresses
Living people
People from Asheville, North Carolina
Actresses from North Carolina
Greensboro College alumni
21st-century American women